Gravesend is a 1996 criminal drama film directed by Salvatore Stabile.

Plot summary
After a quick narration by director Stabile, as well as a flash forward, the film's plot begins with Zane, Mikey, Ray, and Chicken spending a Saturday night in Ray's basement. Throughout the film, the backgrounds of the four young men are explained by Stabile during scenes which pertain to the respected characters the most: Ray's parents died while he was young, which left him to be raised by his older brother Mark. Their upbringing together was bitter and would result in violent tendencies to grow between them.

Zane grew up without a father, and had trouble staying in schools before ultimately being kicked out of his mother's house due to his behavior. Chicken developed drug habits at an early age as a result of witnessing the murder of his older brother, and his mother abandoned him when he was 15. Mikey, who experienced his parents' miserable marriage firsthand, was often humiliated and abused by the rest of the group and had at least two previous instances in which he attempted to commit suicide.

Early into their night, the four get into an argument which wakes up Mark and leads to him getting into a fight with Zane. In attempt to intimidate Mark, Zane points what he believed to be an unloaded pistol at him, resulting in Mark being fatally shot by accident. The group contemplates sending Mark to a hospital or contacting authorities, however Zane instead forces the group to have the corpse be buried by his associate JoJo the Junkie out of fear of being arrested for murder. Naturally this would cause severe tensions to grow between Ray and Zane, with the two splitting the group into factions throughout the rest of the movie.

After getting into a fight and avoiding getting their car towed away, the group convinces JoJo to help. JoJo, a local drug dealer with a history of violence and arrests, agrees to bury Mark's body for a payment of $500 and a severed thumb. The group spends the rest of the night doing various criminal acts in attempt to scrap up money, such as a failed drug deal and an armed robbery at a convenience store.

Eventually, the group goes to Mikey's home to borrow money from his father, where they find him having an affair with another woman. Getting into a heated argument, Mikey takes Zane's pistol and kills both his father and the woman he's with, adding to the group's bodycount.

Finally, Mikey manages to borrow the money from his sister. JoJo, however, refuses to bury all three bodies. Instead, the group leaves two of them at his basement and drives off with one in the trunk. They park the car nearby the beach, sleeping for the rest of the night. The next morning, Mikey leaves the group to jump off a bridge onto a freeway below, killing himself.

Zane shoots Ray, and Chicken shoots Zane while he attempts to dump Ray's body in the car. Chicken finally douses the car and the bodies in gasoline, setting it on fire which kills him as well. The film concludes with Stabile explaining that he moved out of Gravesend afterwards, and that the police investigation ended after a few months of questioning.

Cast
 Anthony Tucci as Zane
 Tom Malloy as Chicken
 Thomas Bradise as Mikey
 Michael Parducci as Ray
 Sean Quinn as Mark
 Mackey Aquilino as JoJo the Junkie
 Carmel Altomare as Zane's Mother
 Teresa Spinelli as Zane's Grandmother
 Glen Sparer as Tow Truck Driver
 David Auerbach as Tony
 Mirada Devin as Mary
 Maurice Carr as Terrance
 Gregg Bello as the Cop
 Anne Rollins as Mikey'S Sister
 Armando J. Cerabino as Mikey's Father
 Kira Burke as the Father's Girlfriend
 Jinn S. Kim as the Store Clerk
 Frits Zernike as the Convenience Store Customer
 Gil Machucha as the Mexican Shop Owner

Production
Gravesend initially started as a novel written by Salvatore Stabile at the age 15, with the characters partially inspired by close friends of his. Stabile, who later attended a film course at New York University, was inspired to turn the story into a movie after watching Kevin Smiths Clerks. Using $5,000 in inheritance he received from his grandmother's passing, filming for the feature began in 1994 and took about three years to complete, with only a 16mm camera utilized due to costs. Due to the tight budget, Stabile was only able to hire actors willing to perform for free. After gaining the attention of investors with the yet-to-be-finished material, Stabile was granted an addition $60,000 to use for post-production, and eventually Steven Spielberg and Oliver Stone convinced Manga Entertainment and Island Digital to distribute it after meeting Stabile.

Release and reception
The film made its screen debut during the 1996 Seattle International Film Festival, and it later made its European debut at the London Film Festival. After acquiring the distribution deal, the film received another screening in New York on September 5, 1997, and later began screening in Los Angeles later that month. In 1998, the film was released on home video VHS and DVD formats through Palm Pictures.

Critical Reception
On Rotten Tomatoes, it holds a "certified fresh" score of 60% based on 10 critic reviews. Roger Ebert gave the film two stars out of a possible four, concluding his review by stating that "there are flashes of life here, a feeling of immediacy in the camera style, a lot of energy--and promise. But it’s not yet the movie he’s probably capable of." Writing for The New York Times, Stephen Holden criticized the movie's plot and characters, ultimately dismissing it.

Soundtrack

A soundtrack album, Music From the Original Motion Picture Gravesend, was released on August 19, 1997 through Island Records. It combines Bill Laswell-composed score with excerpts from the film and songs contributed by several artists, such as Lordz of Brooklyn, Local H, Everlast, Cake, Call O' Da Wild, Cypress Hill and Jake. A single and a music video was produced for Lordz of Brooklyn's "Gravesend (Lake of Fire)" featuring clips from the film

Track listing

References

External links

Official website (archived)

1997 films
American crime drama films
1990s English-language films
1990s American films